The 2019 Abia State gubernatorial election occurred on March 9, 2019. Incumbent PDP Governor Okezie Ikpeazu won re-election for a second term, defeating APC's Uchechukwu Sampson Ogah, and several minor party candidates. The major contenders for the race signed a peace accord agreement in January 2019.

Ikpeazu won in 11 LGAs with a total of 60.26% of popular vote, while Ogah won in four of the state's 17 LGAs with a total of 22.98% of popular vote.

Okezie Ikpeazu emerged unopposed in the PDP gubernatorial primary election. His running mate was Ude Oko Chukwu.

Of the 32 candidates who aspired for the governorship seat, 30 were male, two were female.

Electoral system
The Governor of Abia State is elected using the plurality voting system.

Primary election

PDP primary
The PDP primary election was held on 30 September 2018. Okezie Ikpeazu, the incumbent governor, who was the party sole aspirant, emerged winner with 1,991 delegate votes. The chairperson of the PDP gubernatorial primary elections in Abia State, Chief Raymond Dokpesi, announced there was a total of 2,350 registered delegates from the 17 LGAs of the state, 2,207 used ballots, with 23 invalid votes.

Candidates
Party nominee: Okezie Ikpeazu: Incumbent governor.
Running mate: Ude Okoh Chukwu.

APC primary
The All Progressives Congress (APC) primary election earlier slated to be were held on Sunday 30 September 2018 was rescheduled for Monday 1 October 2018 to be witnessed by the party's National Executive Committee (NEC) coming from Abuja.

However, the Dr. Emmanuel Ndukwe faction of state's APC declared Emenike winner of the contest they went ahead to organise on 30 September 2018, in which he was said to have polled 274,133 votes, defeating six other contenders in the contest. But his name, nevertheless, got omitted from the list forward to the INEC by the party's National Working Committee (NWC). Emenike secured an Abuja court injunction which affirmed Emenike as the party's candidate for the upcoming governorship race.

The official primary election was held Tuesday, October 2, 2018, and the results announced at about 3.45 a.m, on Wednesday by the Chairman of the electoral committee, David Iyoha, announcing Uche Ogah, said to have polled 86,875 votes winner ahead of six other aspirants, including: Chief Martins Azubuike with 10,889 votes, Chief Friday Nwosu with 3,529 votes, Chris Akomas with 2,143 votes, Amb. Okey Emuchey with 1,270 votes, Paul Ikonne with 999 votes, and Chief Ikechi Emenike with 455 votes. A total of 106,160 votes were reportedly cast according to the News Agency of Nigeria (NAN) in the state's 184 wards.

Subsequently, a court ruling in January 2019 affirmed Ogah as winner of the election instead of Emenike. Ogah picked Martins Azubuike, thereafter, as his running mate.

Candidates
Party nominee: Uchechukwu Sampson Ogah.
Running mate: Martins Azubuike.
 Friday Nwosu
 Chris Akomas
 Okey Emuchey
 Paul Ikonne
 Ikechi Emenike

Results
A total of 32 candidates registered with the Independent National Electoral Commission to contest in the election. PDP Governor Okezie Ikpeazu won re-election for a second term, defeating APC Uchechukwu Sampson Ogah, and several minor party candidates. Ikpeazu polled 261,127 votes representing 60.26% of total vote cast, and Ogah 99,574 votes representing 22.98%. Both Ogah and Otti rejected this result. Earlier on, Okezie won at the popular opinion polls.

The total number of registered voters in the state was 1,932,892. Total number of votes cast was 444,376, while total number of valid votes was 433,315. Total rejected votes were 11,061. There we're low voters' turnout.

By local government area
Here are the results of the election from the local government areas of the state for the two major parties. The total valid votes of 433,315 represents the 32 political parties that participated in the election. Green represents LGAs won by Ikpeazu. Blue represents LGAs won by Ogah. White represents LGAs won by Otti.

References 

Abia State
Abia State gubernatorial election
2019
Gubernatorial